Parotocinclus haroldoi is a species of catfish in the family Loricariidae. It is native to South America, where it is known from the state of Piauí in Brazil, with a 2020 redescription defining its range as the Parnaíba River basin. The species reaches 3.5 cm (1.4 inches) SL.

Etymology
The fish is named in honor of ichthyologist Heraldo A. Britski of the Universidade de São Paulo, who loaned Garavello the type specimens, and revised Garavello’s manuscript, and contributed many ideas for the manuscripts improvement.

References 

Loricariidae
Otothyrinae
Taxa named by Júlio César Garavello
Fish described in 1988
Freshwater fish of Brazil